Jahan Nama or Jahan Nema may refer to:
 Jahan Nama, Fars
 Jahan Nama, Golestan